Abu Ishaq ibn Ibrahim ibn Abu al-Fath (1058–1138/9), called Ibn Khafajah (إبن خفاجة), a native of Alzira, was one of the most famous poets of al-Andalus during the reign of the Almoravids. He was born in 1058 in Alzira  (Arabic: جزيرة شقر) near Valencia  where he spent most of his life. He was the maternal uncle of poet Ibn al-Zaqqaq.

He developed nature poetry to a great level of sophistication.  His poetry includes a few panegyrics qasidas, e.g. to Yusuf ibn Tashfin whom he praised out of thankfulness that he had saved Al-Andalus from chaos by retaking the region of Valencia from the Spaniards after the Conquest of Valencia in 1109. During the occupation of the surroundings of Valencia by the Spaniards (ca. 1100) Ibn Khafaja had fled the city to North Africa. He remained unmarried but had many friends and lived to be over eighty.There is a style based on him afterwards followed by many known as 'khafājī'.

According to Salma Khadra Jayyusi, Khafaja demonstrates, in some of his poems a revolutionary attitude to language, using a vocabulary of great originality, which she describes as "warm and sensuous, obsessed with human intimacy, turbulent and conscious of the violence of life around him in a war-ridden country, awed by nature and eternally mystified both by its beauty and by its permanence vis-avis human mutability." His poetry often uses images to a dramatic function, such as contrasting light and darkness, or humanising the night environment.

Composer Mohammed Fairouz set three poems of Ibn Khafajah to music in a cycle of vocal chamber music written for the Cygnus Ensemble.

Notes

Bibliography
Arthur Wormhoudt (ed.), The Diwan of Abu Ishaq Ibn Ibrahim Ibn Abu Al-Fath Ibn Khafaja, Oskaloosa, Ia.: William Penn College, 1987, 
Arie Schippers "Ibn Khafaja (1058-1139) in Morocco. Analysis of a laudatory poem addressed to a member of the Almoravid clan," in: Otto Zwartjes e.a. (ed.) Poetry, Politics and Polemics: Cultural Transfer Between the Iberian Peninsula and North Africa, Amsterdam: Rodopi, 1996,  (pp. 13–34)
Magda M. Al-Nowaihi, The Poetry of Ibn Khafajah A Literary Analysis, (Rev. version of the author's thesis, Harvard, 1987), Leiden: Brill, 1993 
Burgel, J. C., "Man, Nature and Cosmos as Intertwining Elements in the Poetry of Ibn Khafāja," in: Journal of Arabic literature; vol. 14, 1983 (p. 31)
Hamdane Hadjadji and André Miquel, Ibn Khafaja l’Andalou, L’amant de la nature, Paris: El-Ouns,  2002
Abd al-Rahman Janair, Ibn Khafaja l-Andalusi, Beirut: Dar al-Afaq, 1980

External links
 The Mountain Poem English translation and Arabic recording of Ibn Khafaja's most famous poem at Poems Found in Translation.

11th-century writers from al-Andalus
1058 births
1138 deaths
Poets under the Almoravid dynasty
Poets from al-Andalus
People from Alzira, Valencia
Muslim panegyrists